The Hunter 410 is an American sailboat, that was designed by the Hunter Design Team and first built in 1998.

Production
The boat was built by Hunter Marine in the United States, but it is now out of production.

Design

The Hunter 410 is a recreational cruising keelboat, built predominantly of fiberglass. It has a B&R rig, an internally-mounted spade-type rudder and a fixed deep draft fin keel or wing keel. It displaces  and carries  of lead ballast.

The boat has a PHRF racing average handicap of 108 with a high of 117 and low of 96.

See also
List of sailing boat types

Similar boats
Corbin 39

References

External links

Keelboats
1990s sailboat type designs
Sailing yachts
Sailboat type designs by Hunter Design Team
Sailboat types built by Hunter Marine